Segundo Sol (English title: A Second Chance) is a Brazilian telenovela produced and broadcast by TV Globo that premiered on 14 May 2018, replacing O Outro Lado do Paraíso, and ended on 9 November 2018, being replaced by O Sétimo Guardião, with a total of 155 episodes. It is created by João Emanuel Carneiro and directed by Dennis Carvalho.

Set in both 1999 and present time, in Bahia, Segundo Sol gives a trajectory of singer, Beto Falcão, who is forced to fake his death in order to save his family from financial turmoil. In his new identity, named Miguel, he meets Luzia, fishmonger and a mother of two, and an estranged wife to a dead beat; they become romantically involved. Karola, Beto's ex-girlfriend and Laureta Bottini, a brothel-keeper, frame Luzia in the murder of her husband and she is forced to flee, leaving her children behind. Nearly two decades later, Luzia returns as Ariella, a DJ and tries to rebuild her life by reuniting with her children, clearing her name, and  rekindle her love story with Beto / Miguel.

The show stars Giovanna Antonelli, Adriana Esteves, Emílio Dantas, Deborah Secco, Vladimir Brichta, together with a large ensemble cast.

Plot
Set in Salvador in 1999, in the historic district of Santo Antonio, lives the Falcão family. Beto, one of the four sons of Dodô and Nana, made his fame as a singer of axé, but for about three years he has experienced the bitter taste of ostracism. The family earns their livelihood from the crab bar in the same house where they live, but runs the risk of losing their home because of the mismanagement of Beto's career by his manager and brother Remy, the "black sheep" son. To help pay part of the debt, Beto agrees to perform in Aracaju, when the plane he had planned to take crashes at sea and he is presumed dead. Due to the unexpected nationwide commotion, the singer is convinced by Remy and his girlfriend Karola — with whom his relationship is very shaken — to continue passing off as a deceased man by staying in the fictional island of Boiporã. It is at this moment the troubled Beto meets Luzia (Giovanna Antonelli), a fishwife, abandoned by her husband, fending alone for her young children. The two fall in love and soon make plans for marriage, without her knowing the true identity of Beto, who presents himself as Miguel. Hostage of a large plot orchestrated by Karola and Laureta (Adriana Esteves), the couple ends up separated. They find her ex-husband and he tries to kill Beto but Luzia ends up killing him. Luzia, now a fugitive, flees to Iceland, with the help of Goa (André Dias) where she becomes famous as DJ Ariela.

Second phase
After nearly 20 years, Luzia returns to try to reunite her shattered family, without imagining that Miguel, her great love that she could not forget, is the famous singer Beto Falcão. Along with his family, Beto maintains to this day the farce of his death and is unhappy with the course that life has taken. He also keeps his love for Luzia alive and goes crazy when he discovers that the fishmonger, now a successful DJ, is in Salvador and will do everything to find her and rekindle their past romances.

Cast

 Giovanna Antonelli as Luzia Batista / Ariella Arlesisla
 Emilio Dantas as Roberto "Beto" Falcão / Miguel
 Deborah Secco as Caroline "Karola" Falcão
 Adriana Esteves as Laureta Botini / Divinéia dos Santos
 Vladimir Brichta as Remildo "Remy" Falcão
 José de Abreu as Dorival "Dodô" Falcão
 Arlete Salles as Nazira "Naná" Falcão
 Fabrício Boliveira as Roberval Santos
 Caco Ciocler as Edgar Athayde
 Maria Luísa Mendonça as Karen Athayde
 Odilon Wagner as Severo Athayde
 Francisco Cuoco as Nestor Maranhão
 Chay Suede as Ícaro Batista
 Luisa Arraes as Manuela Batista
 Danilo Mesquita as Valentim Batista Falcão
 Letícia Colin as Rosa Câmara 
 Nanda Costa as Maura Câmara
 Fabiula Nascimento as Maria Cláudia "Cacau" Batista
 Giovanna Lancelloti as Rochelle Athayde
 Armando Babaioff as Ionan Falcão
 Roberta Rodrigues as Doralice
 Danilo Ferreira as Acácio Pereira
 Luis Lobianco as Clóvis Falcão
 Thalita Carauta as Gorete
 André Dias as Groa
 Claudia di Moura as Josefa "Zefa" Santos
 João Acaiabe as Pai Didico
 Roberto Bonfim as Agenor Câmara 
 Kelzy Ecard as Eunice "Nice" Câmara
 Gabriela Moreyra as Renata "Renatinha"
 Osmar Silveira as Narciso Rangel
 Pablo Morais as Tomé
 Robertha Portella as Ariadna
 Hugo Moura as Robinson "Robinho"
 Marcelo Augusto
 Carol Fazu as Selma
 Drayson Menezes as Wander
 Narcival Rubens as Galdino Navarro
 Ciro Sales as Du Love
 Ícaro Zulu as Dorival "Doni" Falcão Neto
 Vinicius Nascimento
 Ygor Rodrigues as Tupã
 Ittalo Paixão
 Bia Barros
 Larissa Marques

Guest cast
 Renata Sorrah as Dulce Botini
 Cássia Kis Magro as Claudine Athayde
 Fernando Sampaio
 Tuca Andrada as Juarez Garcia 
 Ingra Liberato as Fátima Garcia 
 Paulo Borges as Edilei
 Zeca de Abreu as Januária
 Jayme Periard as Vicente 
 Thales Miranda as young Ícaro
 Rafaela Brazil as young Manuela
 Daniella Mercury as himself 
 Ana Maria Braga as himself 
 Fátima Bernardes as himself

Production
João Emanuel Carneiro began developing the series in October 2016. Initially the show was tentatively under the title Da Volta Pra Casa, but was later changed to Segundo Sol. In January 2017 the synopsis was presented to the network and was approved, giving endorsement for the creator to continue developing the story and enter into phase of pre-production for the 2018–19 season.  The approval of a telenovela in Bahia was a strategic move, since it was a state where Rede Globo did not reach the top spot for years, second to RecordTV's productions.

Filming
In October 2017, the set design team was sent to Bahia in search for small villages with preserved natural beauty to be the backdrop of the first phase. Despite the synopsis of the first phase set in Boipeba in Cairu, the production crew decided not use it due lack of infrastructure to carry the equipments, choosing to record the scenes in another city—Caraíva—but the team faced difficulties; the Municipal Environmental Council of Caraíva was against the recordings, fearing that exposing the place at national level could attract an exaggerated tourism and generate degradation of the natural ecosystem. In order to decide the impasse, the council established a referendum, in which 88% of the village population voted against filming the show there.

On 7 December 2017, it was announced that the recordings would take place in Trancoso, a village in Porto Seguro, which had already benefited from the tourism brought by the recording of the DVD, Acústico em Trancoso by Ivete Sangalo in 2016. The two houses used by the protagonists were not scenographic; they were actually built on the beach specifically for recordings and donated to local residents after filming ended. In February 2018, Emilio Dantas, Deborah Secco and Adriana Esteves travelled to Salvador and recorded the first scenes of the telenovela during the 2018 Carnival. In March, besides the fore mentioned three, Giovanna Antonelli, Vladimir Brichta, Arlete Salles, José de Abreu, Fabiula Nascimento, Armando Babaioff and Luis Lobianco also began filming the first phase in Salvador and Trancoso. The city was built in the scenic Estúdios Globo, compiling the houses of the characters, as well as replica of the district of San Antonio.

Soundtrack

Volume 1

Segundo Sol: Vol. 1 is the first installment of the series of soundtracks of the telenovela. "Axé Pelô" (released on 14 May 2018), composed by the shows star,  Emilio Dantas was specifically produced for the show.

Volume 2

Segundo Sol: Vol. 2 is the second installment of the soundtrack of the telenovela, released on 20 July 2018.

Volume 3

Segundo Sol: Vol. 3 is the third installment of the soundtrack of the telenovela, released on 5 September 2018.

Reception

Ratings

References

External links
  
 

TV Globo telenovelas
Brazilian telenovelas
Telenovelas by João Emanuel Carneiro
2018 telenovelas
2018 Brazilian television series debuts
2018 Brazilian television series endings
Lesbian-related television shows
Brazilian LGBT-related television shows
Portuguese-language telenovelas
Child abduction in television
Television series about fictional musicians